Alf Ivar Eriksen (born 7 March 1942) is a former speed skater from Norway.

He won a silver medal in 1500 m., shared with Ard Schenk, at the 1968 Winter Olympics in Grenoble; at the 1964 Winter Olympics in Innsbruck he came on sixth place on the same distance. Over the course of his career, Eriksen skated five world records and was the first to skate 1,000 m below 1:20.0. After the 1972 season, Eriksen joined the European long track skaters' professional league, the International Speedskating League.

World records

Source: SpeedSkatingStats.com

Personal records
500 m – 39.1
1000 m – 1:19.2 
1500 m – 2:04.0 
5000 m – 7:55.6 
10000 m – 16:33.4

References

1942 births
Living people
World record setters in speed skating
Norwegian male speed skaters
Olympic silver medalists for Norway
Olympic speed skaters of Norway
Speed skaters at the 1964 Winter Olympics
Speed skaters at the 1968 Winter Olympics
Olympic medalists in speed skating
Medalists at the 1968 Winter Olympics
Sportspeople from Hamar